The Junior men's race at the 1983 IAAF World Cross Country Championships was held in Gateshead, England, at the Riverside Park on March 20, 1983.   A report on the event was given in the Glasgow Herald and in the Evening Times.

Complete results, medallists, 
 and the results of British athletes were published.

Race results

Junior men's race (8.033 km)

Individual

Teams

Note: Athletes in parentheses did not score for the team result

Participation
An unofficial count yields the participation of 107 athletes from 25 countries in the Junior men's race.  This is in agreement with the official numbers as published.

 (2)
 (6)
 (6)
 (2)
 (6)
 (6)
 (6)
 (5)
 (1)
 (5)
 (4)
 (6)
 (1)
 (6)
 (1)
 (6)
 (6)
 (5)
 (6)
 (1)
 (2)
 (5)
 (1)
 (6)
 (6)

See also
 1983 IAAF World Cross Country Championships – Senior men's race
 1983 IAAF World Cross Country Championships – Senior women's race

References

Junior men's race at the World Athletics Cross Country Championships
IAAF World Cross Country Championships
1983 in youth sport